Isaac Fitzgerald Shepard (July 7, 1816 – August 25, 1899) was a colonel in the Union Army during the American Civil War. His appointment as a brigadier general of volunteers was not confirmed by the United States Senate and expired on July 4, 1864.

Biography
Shepard was born in Natick, Massachusetts on July 7, 1816. He graduated from Harvard University in 1842.

Shepard was appointed a major in the Missouri Militia (Union) on June 18, 1861. In August 1861, he became an assistant adjutant general to Brigadier General Nathaniel Lyon. He was wounded at the Battle of Wilson's Creek on August 10, 1861. He was appointed lieutenant colonel of the 19th Missouri Volunteer Infantry Regiment on August 30, 1861 and colonel of the 3rd Missouri Volunteer Infantry Regiment on January 18, 1862 when the regiments were consolidated. He was appointed colonel of the 51st United States Colored Infantry Regiment on May 9, 1863.  As a colonel he led the African Brigade, XVII Corps, Army of the Tennessee, during the Siege of Vicksburg.

On November 17, 1863, Shepard was appointed brigadier general of volunteers, to rank from October 27, 1863. He was stationed at Vicksburg, Mississippi with a brigade of three regiments of United States Colored Troops. The United States Senate did not confirm his appointment as brigadier general and it expired on July 4, 1864. Shepard then returned to Missouri.

Isaac Fitzgerald Shepard died on August 25, 1889 in Bellingham, Massachusetts. He was buried in Ashland Cemetery, Middlesex County, Massachusetts.

See also

List of American Civil War generals (Union)

Notes

References 
 Eicher, John H., and David J. Eicher, Civil War High Commands. Stanford: Stanford University Press, 2001. .
 Warner, Ezra J. Generals in Blue: Lives of the Union Commanders. Baton Rouge: Louisiana State University Press, 1964. .

People of Missouri in the American Civil War
Union Army generals
Union Army colonels
Harvard University alumni
People from Natick, Massachusetts
1816 births
1889 deaths
Military personnel from Massachusetts